Jeremy Davies (né Boring; born October 28, 1969) is an American film and television actor. He is known for playing Ray Aibelli in Spanking the Monkey (1994), Corporal Upham in Saving Private Ryan (1998), Snow in Solaris (2002), Bill Henson in Dogville (2003), Charles Manson in Helter Skelter (2004), Sergeant Gene DeBruin in Rescue Dawn (2006) and Daniel Faraday on the series Lost (2008–2010).

Davies won an Emmy Award for Outstanding Guest Actor in a Drama Series in 2012 for his portrayal of Dickie Bennett in the series Justified (2011–2015). He also received the BAFTA Award for Best Performance in a Video Game for his role as Baldur in God of War (2018).

Early life
Jeremy Davies was born in Traverse City, Michigan, of Scottish and Welsh descent, the son of children's author Melvin Lyle "Mel" Boring. Davies is Jeremy's mother's maiden name, which he adopted as his professional name. He has a brother, Joshua, and two half-siblings, Zachery and Katrina, from his father's second marriage.

His parents separated when he was young, leaving Davies to relocate to Kansas with his mother until the mid-1970s, when she died of lupus. He went to live with his father and his stepmother in Santa Barbara, California, before moving to Rockford, Iowa in 1986, where he completed high school. He attended college at the American Academy of Dramatic Arts in California.

Career
In 1991 he played Roger, Robin's first boyfriend, on General Hospital. In 1992, he appeared on two episodes of The Wonder Years. He appeared in small roles in the NBC TV film Shoot First: A Cop's Vengeance and in the pilot for the colonial-era sitcom 1775. He played a youth in the Showtime thriller Guncrazy and had a guest appearance on Melrose Place. In 1993, Davies was cast in a TV commercial for Subaru in which his character compares the car to punk rock. Numerous casting directors and industry forces noticed the commercial, and Davies found himself being sent feature film scripts. Critics embraced his performance in David O. Russell's debut film, the black comedy Spanking the Monkey.

In 1998, he landed a pivotal role in Steven Spielberg's Saving Private Ryan as Corporal Upham, an American GI linguist in Normandy, recruited just after the Normandy landings by Captain John Miller (Tom Hanks) to be the interpreter on a dangerous mission to rescue the film's eponymous paratrooper (Matt Damon). Davies' performance was well received, and he went on to star in several films, including CQ, Secretary and Solaris. In 2004, he portrayed Charles Manson in CBS's adaptation of Helter Skelter. In 2006, he appeared in Rescue Dawn. Werner Herzog, who directed Davies in Rescue Dawn, described Davies as "a unique, very significant talent", asserting that "anywhere in the world, there [are] very, very few actors of his calibre."

Davies appeared as a main cast member on Lost during its fourth and fifth seasons (2008–09), playing Daniel Faraday, an amnesiac physicist who comes to the island as part of a team hired by Charles Widmore. He guest-starred in three episodes in Losts sixth season. He had a recurring role on FX's Justified as Dickie Bennett, for which he earned a Primetime Emmy Award for Outstanding Guest Actor in a Drama Series in 2012. He was also nominated for the award in 2011. In 2014, Davies appeared in two episodes of Hannibal. He starred in the History Channel's 2015 miniseries Texas Rising, as Sergeant Ephraim Knowles. This was his second role in a production with Bill Paxton, the first being 1996's film Twister. In the 2017 TV drama American Gods he plays one version of Jesus Christ, and in the 2018 video game God of War he provided the voice and motion capture for Baldur.

Filmography

Film

Television

Video games

References

External links

 
 

1969 births
American male film actors
American male television actors
American male voice actors
Living people
Male actors from Santa Barbara, California
Male actors from Iowa
Male actors from Michigan
People from Floyd County, Iowa
People from Traverse City, Michigan
Primetime Emmy Award winners
20th-century American male actors
21st-century American male actors
Male actors from Kansas
American people of Scottish descent
American people of Welsh descent
BAFTA winners (people)